Ahmed Krama is an Algerian Olympic middle-distance runner. He represented his country in the men's 1500 meters at the 1996 Summer Olympics. His time was a 3:42.09.

References

1973 births
Living people
Algerian male middle-distance runners
Olympic athletes of Algeria
Athletes (track and field) at the 1996 Summer Olympics
21st-century Algerian people
20th-century Algerian people